Ieroklis Stoltidis (born 2 February 1975), also known as "Iéro", is a Greek former professional footballer who played as a central midfielder. He was known as a passionate, determined anchorman with mental and physical courage.

Club career
Stoltidis started out with Pontioi Kozanis FC in the fourth division before signing for Iraklis FC, where he spent eleven years. He made his Alpha Ethniki debut for the Thessaloniki-based club in December 1992 but did not become a regular until 1995–96. The following term he played UEFA Cup football for the first time. Stoltidis stood out in 2002–03 and was named the club's player of the season. In June, after 234 league matches, he left for Olympiacos CFP, signing a two-year contract. He was signed to replace Zé Elias at Olympiacos.

Crucial goals against eventual champions Panathinaikos and AEK Athens in 2003–04 endeared him to supporters. Stoltidis also relished his first taste of UEFA Champions League football, scoring twice in five appearances. A regular in Dusan Bajevic's side in 2004–05, he played 25 league matches and scored twice. He appeared in all 540 minutes of the Champions League campaign and scored the winner at home against eventual champions Liverpool. In the same season, he won the Alpha Ethniki as well as the Greek Cup with Olympiacos.

During the 2005–06 season, he started in the first eleven in the Greek El Clasico, Panathinaikos vs Olympiacos, and went on to score in Olympiacos' 2–0 victory. On 23 November 2005, during a Champions League fixture against Rosenborg, he made a reckless challenge on 18-year-old opponent Per Ciljan Skjelbred, breaking both bones in the teenager's lower leg just above the ankle. Stoltidis finished the season with another Olympiacos double as well as the award for Greek Footballer of the Year.

The 2007–08 season would once again prove successful for Stoltidis. One half of Takis Lemonis' defensive midfield duo, Akis formed a strong partnership with Argentine international Cristian Raul Ledesma. Stoltidis also continued his streak of Champions League success, this time helping Olympiacos finish second and gaining entry into the Round of 16. Finishing the group stages with three goals and two assists, Stoltidis pulled off some of the most memorable performances of his career, notably the 3–1 (away) and 3–0 (home) victories against Werder Bremen where Stoltidis found the back of the net three times.

In 2010, he signed with Kerkyra on a one-year contract where he would finish his career a year later in 2011.

International career
Stoltidis was a member of the Greece side defeated in the 1998 UEFA European Under-21 Championship final by Spain. In November 1999, he made his debut for the senior national team and he went on to represent Greece at the Athens Olympics in 2004. Despite performing at a high rate for his club Olympiakos, he was left out of the UEFA Euro 2004 championship winning squad and the FIFA World Cup 2006 or UEFA Euro 2008 campaigns.

Finally, after years of media speculation, Stoltidis was called to the National Team under Rehhagel for a friendly against the Czech Republic. He declined the invitation stating "I'm no longer at an age where I can perform on all those fronts at the required level. Apart from my gratitude to the fans for their support, I want to assure them that, had this call come earlier in my career, when I was capable of competing on all fronts at a high level, I would have put myself at the disposal of the coach without hesitation."

Career statistics

Honours

Olympiacos
 Superleague Greece: 2004-05, 2005-06, 2006-07, 2007-08, 2008-09
 Greek Football Cup: 2004-05, 2005-06, 2007-08, 2008-09
 Greek Super Cup: 2007

Individual
 Greek Footballer of the year: 2005-06

References

External links
11v11.com profile & stats

1975 births
Living people
Greek footballers
Association football midfielders
Olympic footballers of Greece
Olympiacos F.C. players
Iraklis Thessaloniki F.C. players
A.O. Kerkyra players
Footballers at the 2004 Summer Olympics
Greece international footballers
Greece under-21 international footballers
Super League Greece players
Footballers from Thessaloniki